Reload is the seventh studio album by American heavy metal band Metallica, released on November 18, 1997 via Elektra Records. The album is a follow-up to Load, released the previous year, and Metallica's last studio album to feature the ...And Justice for All-era lineup, with bassist Jason Newsted leaving the band in January 2001, though it was not his last release with the band. Reload debuted at number one on the Billboard 200, selling 436,000 copies in its first week. It was certified 3× platinum by the Recording Industry Association of America (RIAA) for shipping three million copies in the United States.

Background
Reload was recorded at The Plant, a wood-panelled studio in Sausalito, California. The session was produced by Bob Rock, who also produced Metallica's previous two albums. The original idea was to release Load and Reload as a double album. However, with problems recording so many songs at one time, the band decided that half of the songs were to be released and the band would continue to work on the remaining songs and release them the following year.

Speaking about the recording sessions in an interview for Guitar World, guitarist Kirk Hammett stated that "We were gonna do them both as a double album, but we didn't want to spend that long in the studio. Also, if we did a double album, it would have been a lot more material for people to digest, and some of it might have gotten lost in the shuffle." It was the final Metallica studio album to feature the ...And Justice for All-era lineup with bassist Jason Newsted leaving the band in January 2001, though it was not his last release with the band.

Reload marks the first album to feature a guest singer (Marianne Faithfull in "The Memory Remains").

This was the second album to feature most songs in E♭ tuning, with "Bad Seed" being played in D♭ tuning and "Devil's Dance" in D tuning. D tuning was earlier used for "The Thing That Should Not Be" on Master of Puppets, "Sad but True" on Metallica and later used for "Sabbra Cadabra",  and "Whiskey in the Jar" from Garage Inc. Seven songs from the album have been played live, "Fuel", "The Memory Remains", "Devil's Dance", "The Unforgiven II", "Carpe Diem Baby", "Low Man's Lyric" and "Fixxxer".

There were occasional jam sessions of songs such as "Better Than You", "Bad Seed", "Where the Wild Things Are", and "Fixxxer". "Carpe Diem Baby" premiered at Metallica's 30th anniversary concert in 2011.

'Fixxxer' premiered at Metallica's first 40th anniversary concert at the Chase Center in San Francisco, on December 17, 2021.

Songs that have not been played live in their entirety are "Better than You", "Slither", "Bad Seed", "Where the Wild Things Are", "Prince Charming" and "Attitude".

Artwork and packaging
Like Load, the album artwork was again created by Andres Serrano, which is a mix of bovine blood and his own urine. Hence, the artwork is titled "Piss and Blood XXVI". All the photos in the liner notes were taken from the 1997 Cunning Stunts concert.

Reception

AllMusic's Stephen Thomas Erlewine thought the record was worthwhile and noted it was heavily influenced by Southern rock. He did not approve of the idea of doing the sequel "The Unforgiven II", but praised the collaboration with Marianne Faithfull on "The Memory Remains". Dan Snierson from Entertainment Weekly said Reload "continues Metallica's journey into stripped-down maturity while toying with fresh melodic textures" and "also forsakes some of the punchy hooks and gut-clenching heft that elevated recent Metallica CDs".

Rolling Stones Lorraine Ali opined the album was rooted in heavy metal despite some songs being influenced by "bluesy rock & roll". She said Reload was not Metallica's best, but named it a steppingstone in Metallica's legacy. On the other hand, Musician described the album as "greasy, driving, full of fat grooves, lyric and rhythmic hooks, and sonic curveballs". The magazine felt it "captures one of rock's greatest bands at its peak".

Canadian journalist Martin Popoff lamented the "dull, unfinished, unrealized" songwriting in many songs, but praised the production and groove of the album.
British author Paul Stenning said Metallica were "at their best on the likes of opener 'Fuel', the inspired follow up to an old favourite in 'The Unforgiven II' and the closing 'Fixxxer' which had a fantastic lead riff."

In 2020, Metal Hammer included it in their list of top 10 albums of 1997.

Reload sold 436,000 units in first week and debuted at number one on the Billboard 200. The album remained on the chart for 75 weeks, and sold just over four million copies in the United States by December 2009. It was certified 3× platinum by the Recording Industry Association of America (RIAA) for shipping three million copies in the United States. Reload peaked at number two on the Canadian Albums Chart, and was certified double platinum by Music Canada.

Track listing

Personnel

Metallica
 James Hetfield – vocals, rhythm guitar, guitar solo on "Carpe Diem Baby", production
 Kirk Hammett – lead & rhythm guitar
 Jason Newsted – bass guitar
 Lars Ulrich – drums, production

Additional musicians
 Marianne Faithfull – additional vocals on "The Memory Remains"
 Bernardo Bigalli – violin on "Low Man's Lyric"
 David Miles – hurdy-gurdy on "Low Man's Lyric"
 Jim McGillveray – percussion

Production
 Bob Rock – production
 Brian Dobbs – engineering
 Randy Staub – engineering, mixing
 Bernardo Bigalli – assistant engineering
 Darren Grahn – assistant engineering, digital editing
 Kent Matcke – assistant engineering
 Gary Winger – assistant engineering
 Mike Fraser – mixing
 George Marino – mastering
 Paul DeCarli – digital editing
 Mike Gillies – digital editing
 Andie Airfix – design
 Andres Serrano – cover design
 Anton Corbijn – photography

Charts

Weekly charts

Year-end charts

Certifications

References

External links

1997 albums
Metallica albums
Albums produced by Bob Rock
Elektra Records albums
Vertigo Records albums
Sequel albums